This is a list of films which have placed number one at the weekend box office in the United Kingdom.

List of 1985 box office number-one films in the United Kingdom
List of 1986 box office number-one films in the United Kingdom
List of 1987 box office number-one films in the United Kingdom
List of 1988 box office number-one films in the United Kingdom
List of 1989 box office number-one films in the United Kingdom
List of 1990 box office number-one films in the United Kingdom
List of 1991 box office number-one films in the United Kingdom
List of 1992 box office number-one films in the United Kingdom
List of 1993 box office number-one films in the United Kingdom
List of 1994 box office number-one films in the United Kingdom
List of 1995 box office number-one films in the United Kingdom
List of 1996 box office number-one films in the United Kingdom
List of 1997 box office number-one films in the United Kingdom
List of 1998 box office number-one films in the United Kingdom
List of 1999 box office number-one films in the United Kingdom
List of 2000 box office number-one films in the United Kingdom
List of 2001 box office number-one films in the United Kingdom
List of 2002 box office number-one films in the United Kingdom
List of 2003 box office number-one films in the United Kingdom
List of 2004 box office number-one films in the United Kingdom
List of 2005 box office number-one films in the United Kingdom
List of 2006 box office number-one films in the United Kingdom
List of 2007 box office number-one films in the United Kingdom
List of 2008 box office number-one films in the United Kingdom
List of 2009 box office number-one films in the United Kingdom
List of 2010 box office number-one films in the United Kingdom
List of 2011 box office number-one films in the United Kingdom
List of 2012 box office number-one films in the United Kingdom
List of 2013 box office number-one films in the United Kingdom
List of 2014 box office number-one films in the United Kingdom
List of 2015 box office number-one films in the United Kingdom
List of 2016 box office number-one films in the United Kingdom
List of 2017 box office number-one films in the United Kingdom
List of 2018 box office number-one films in the United Kingdom
List of 2019 box office number-one films in the United Kingdom
List of 2020 box office number-one films in the United Kingdom
List of 2021 box office number-one films in the United Kingdom
List of 2022 box office number-one films in the United Kingdom
List of 2023 box office number-one films in the United Kingdom

See also 
 List of British films — British films by year